Porumbacu de Jos is a commune in Sibiu County, Transylvania, central Romania, first documented in 1473. It is composed of five villages: Colun, Porumbacu de Jos, Porumbacu de Sus, Sărata, and Scoreiu.

The commune is located in the southeastern part of the country, at the extreme west of the historical region of Țara Făgărașului.

It is a base for hiking and climbing tours to the Southern Carpathians, notably the Negoiu chalet at  altitude, which lies at the foot of Negoiu Peak.

Natives
 Ioan Alexandru Lapedatu

References

Communes in Sibiu County
Localities in Transylvania